Thomas Franklin Hughes (August 6, 1907 – August 10, 1989) was a reserve outfielder in Major League Baseball, playing mainly at center field for the Detroit Tigers during the  season. A native of Emmet, Arkansas, he attended University of Texas at Austin. 
 
In his one-season career, Hughes was a .373 hitter (22-for-59) in 17 games, including eight runs, two doubles, three triples, and a .413 on-base percentage.

Hughes died in Beaumont, Texas, at the age of 82.

External links

Retrosheet

Detroit Tigers players
Major League Baseball center fielders
Texas Longhorns baseball players
Baseball players from Arkansas
1907 births
1989 deaths
People from Emmet, Arkansas